The following is a list of mainland Chinese films first released in 2009. There were 88 Chinese feature films released in China in 2009.

Highest-grossing films
The following are the 10 highest-grossing Chinese films released in China in 2009.

Films released

See also 
 2009 in China

References

External links
IMDb list of Chinese films

Chinese
Films
2009